The Anglo Arabic Senior Secondary School or more commonly, Anglo Arabic School, is a co-educational government aided school in New Delhi, India. The school is managed by Delhi Education Society. Prof. Najma Akhtar is the president of the School Managing Committee and Prof. Mohd Muslim Khan is the manager of the school. It was founded in 1696 by Ghazi ud-Din Khan Feroze Jung I.

History 

It was initially founded by Mir Shihab-Ud-din, also known as Ghaziuddin Khan. He was a general of Mughal Emperor Aurangzeb, a leading Deccan commander and the father of Qamar-ud-din Khan, Asaf Jah I, the founder of the Asaf Jahi dynasty of Hyderabad, also known as the first Nizam of Hyderabad, in 1690s, and was originally termed Madrasa Ghaziuddin Khan after him. However, with a weakening Mughal Empire, the Madrasa closed in the early 1790s, but with the support of local nobility, an oriental college for literature, science and art, was established at the site in 1792.

It stood just outside the walled city of Delhi outside the Ajmeri Gate, close to the New Delhi Railway Station. It was originally surrounded by a wall and connected to the walled city fortifications and was referred to as the College Bastion.

It was reorganized as the 'Anglo Arabic College' by the British East India Company in 1828 to provide, in addition to its original objectives, an education in English language and literature. The object was "to uplift"  educational status of the community living in vicinity.." Behind the move was Charles Trevelyan, the brother-in-law of Thomas Babingdon Macaulay the father of modern education in India also played key role in this process of educational uplift of the society".

Dr. Sprenger, then principal, presided over the founding of the college press, the Matba‘u ’l-‘Ulum and founded the first college periodical, the weekly Qiranu ’s-Sa‘dain, in 1845.

Notable alumni 
 Sir Syed Ahmed Khan, founder of Aligarh Muslim University
 Meem Afzal, Politician
 Muhammad Husain Azad, writer
 Akhtar ul Iman, poet
 Mirza Masood, hockey Olympian

Book chronicles
Anglo Arabic School at the Ajmeri Gate is in the 330th year of its foundation. Two former administrators of this educational institution have chronicled the history and legacy of one of the oldest running Muslim schools in India. The book is titled " The School at Ajmeri Gate: Delhi Educational Legacy is published by Oxford University Press. The book contains the detailed history of the school.

See also 
 Zakir Husain Delhi College, another descendant of the original institution

References

External links 

 

Educational institutions established in the 1690s
High schools and secondary schools in Delhi
1949 establishments in India
1696 establishments in Asia